Shrewsbury bus station is a bus station and terminus located on Raven Meadows in the centre of Shrewsbury, the county town of Shropshire, England.

Local and inter-city services, predominantly operated by Arriva Midlands North, run from the station. Additional services are operated by Lakeside Coaches, Tanat Valley, Celtic Travel and Minsterley Motors.

The station is connected to the Darwin Shopping Centre by an escalator and is adjacent to a Premier Inn hotel. Facilities include toilets, baby changing, a car park, anewsagent shop and a travel agent. It is also located 0.1 mi from Shrewsbury railway station.

The station is considered to be dated due to its 1980s architecture partially under a 1960s multi-storey car park. There have been plans for the station to be modernised and rebuilt, or even demolished completely, as part of the town's "Big Town Plan". The demolition of the station would mean the town would not have a central bus terminus and would instead use smaller sites on the town's Park and Ride routes.

Routes

References

Bus stations in England
Shrewsbury
Transport in Shropshire